The Lincoln House in Stickney, South Dakota was built in the Early Commercial architectural style by Sylvester Miller. It primarily functioned as a medical office for a Dr. Beukelman. It has two contributing buildings on the property.

It was constructed in 1915 and added to the National Register of Historic Places in 2002.  It is built of red-brown brick laid in common bond, on a stone foundation, and has a flat roof.

It was deemed notable as "a good example of Commercial architecture and ... one of few historic commercial buildings left in Stickney."

A side gable historic privy is the second contributing resource on the property.

References

Commercial buildings on the National Register of Historic Places in South Dakota
Buildings designated early commercial in the National Register of Historic Places
Commercial buildings completed in 1915
Buildings and structures in Aurora County, South Dakota
National Register of Historic Places in Aurora County, South Dakota